The Ex-Wife of My Life or L'Ex-femme de ma vie is a 2005 French comedy-drama film directed by Josiane Balasko and starring Balasko, Karin Viard and Thierry Lhermitte. It is the sixth film directed by Balasko.

Plot
Tom is a successful popular novelist. He will soon marry again. However, he meets his previous wife in a restaurant. She is penniless, homeless, and seven and a half months pregnant. She asks him for help. Tom decides to host her. Quickly, his ex-wife and her psychiatrist friend invade his home.

Cast

 Thierry Lhermitte as Tom
 Karin Viard as Nina
 Josiane Balasko as Marie-Pierre Sarrazin
 Nadia Farès as Ariane
 Didier Flamand as René
 Micheline Dax as Madame Belin
 Nicolas Silberg as Bourdin
 Francia Seguy as Madeleine
 Stella Rocha as Tamira
 Walter Dickerson as Elvire
 Joseph Menant as Lulu
 Sylvie Herbert as Geneviève
 George Aguilar as Forcené M. Alvarez
 Dolly Golden as Cynthia
 Raymonde Bourgeois as Rebecca
 Dominique Aliot as Marilyn
 Luciano Federico as The cooker
 Lucien Jean-Baptiste as The inspector

Release
The film premiered at the Marrakech International Film Festival in 2004.

References

External links

2005 films
2005 comedy-drama films
French comedy-drama films
2000s French-language films
Films directed by Josiane Balasko
Warner Bros. films
2000s French films